Registro is a city near the Atlantic coast of São Paulo, Brazil. The population is 56,393 (2020 est.) in an area of 722 km². The elevation is 25 m. Registro in Portuguese means register, and this name was given to the city because it was the port from which the earlier settlers registered the gold that was leaving on ships from Brazil headed to Portugal.

Culture
International Cultural Events

Sushi Festival

Organized by an association of Japanese immigrants called “Associação Cultural Nipo Brasileira de Registro”, this festival offers so many music attractions and typical Japanese cuisine, like as: sushis and sashimis (tuna, salmon and a bunch of local fishes such as “robalo, tainha and manjuba”, the last one is the most famous delicacy, fried-manjuba with cold beer is a good option to enjoy the summer days over there). This festival happens every year on June.

Tooro Nagashi

Since 2009 the “Associação Cultural Nipo-Brasileira de Registro” has been promoting in the beginning of August an event that pays tribute and remembers the World War II consequencies to the Japanese population, trying to take the attention of their youth about how is so important to maintain the state of peace, the culture of peace. Inspired by the atomic bomb victims that were frown out by United States of America over two Japanese cities, with only 3 days of time space from the first one, Hiroshima and Nagasaki. Tooro means lantern of paper and nagashi means taking by the wind.

Transportation
Registro is served by Alberto Bertelli Airport.

Sister city relations
 - Nakatsugawa, Gifu, Japan, since 1980

References